Hervé McCarthy Makuka (born 19 January 1986 in Giswil) is a Swiss footballer who plays for FC Wettswil-Bonstetten.

Career 
He began his career by FC Sarnen before 2000 joined to the youth from FC Luzern and played 51 games with the youth and shoots 6 goals, in 2004 was promoted to the first team and climbed with his team 2006 in the Swiss Super League, in summer 2008 left the team and moved to SC Cham. After a half-year which scores two goals in 17 games signed for FC Tuggen in January 2009. In 2010, he joined FC Baden.

References

External links 

Hervé Makuka at FootMercato.net

1986 births
Living people
Swiss men's footballers
SC Cham players
FC Luzern players
Swiss Super League players
Association football midfielders
Swiss people of Democratic Republic of the Congo descent